Drasenhofen is a municipality in the district of Mistelbach in the Austrian state of Lower Austria. It is located directly on the border with Czech Republic. In the future the Austrian A5 Nordautobahn from Vienna will connect to the Czech Expressway R52.

Subdivisions
The subdivisions of Drasenhofen are:
 Drasenhofen
 Steinebrunn
 Stützenhofen
 Kleinschweinbarth

Population

References

External links
Official website

Cities and towns in Mistelbach District
Austria–Czech Republic border crossings